The 2004–05 snooker season was a series of snooker tournaments played between 4 August 2004 and 8 May 2005.  The following table outlines the results for ranking events and the invitational events.


Calendar

Official rankings 

The top 16 of the world rankings, these players automatically played in the final rounds of the world ranking events and were invited for the Masters.

Points distribution 
2004/2005 Points distribution for world ranking events, all new players received double points:

Notes

References

External links

2004
Season 2005
Season 2004